Shelleng is a Local Government Area (LGA) of Adamawa State, North-east Nigeria.

The LGA shares borders with Guyuk and Girei LGA and is made up of towns and villages such as Kiri, Bodwai, Gundo, Jumbul, Shelleng, Timbu, Ketembere, Dunge, Boburo, and Tallum. Shelleng Local government has an estimated population of 190,671 inhabitants with the area consisting members of varying ethnic group such as the Fulani, Lala, Kana Kuri, Kiri, and the Bura. The Bura language is one of the spoken languages in Shelleng LGA while the religions of Christianity and Islam are commonly practiced in the area. Popular festivals celebrated in Shelleng LGA include the Mendamo festival while the landmarks in the area include the Kiri Dam and the Shelleng Cottage Hospital.

Geography
Shelleng local government covers a total area of 1,359 square kilometres and has an average temperature of 32 °C. It lies along the Lake Chad Basin and has the Kiri and Gongola River flowing through its territory.

Economy
Fishing, farming, trading of livestocks and animal rearing are economic activities with domestic animals such as cows, goats, rams, and horses reared and sold in large quantities within the area. The LGA is also home to a vibrant trade sector, hosting several markets such as kasuwan jun ma’a (friday market) and kasuwan kiri (kiri market) where a wide variety of commodities are bought and sold. Other economic activities undertaken by the people of Shelleng LGA include hunting, pottery and crafts making. The Kiri Dam is used for supplying water for agriculture in the area and aides fishing.

External links
 manpower.com.ng, Shelleng Local government Adamawa state.
 thegiantreport, news and all the latest happening from Shelleng Local government.
 indiscov.com, documentary video of shelleng

Local Government Areas in Adamawa State